Diego Gambale (born 9 November 1998) is an Italian professional footballer who plays as a forward for  club Avellino on loan from Montevarchi.

Club career
Born in Rome, Gambale started his career in Lupa Roma youth sector. He moved to Eccellenza club Boreale  for the 2018–19 season, he played 36 and scored 21 goals with the club.

On 17 June 2019, he joined to Serie D club Montespaccato Calcio.

On 13 July 2021, Gambale signed with Serie C club Montevarchi. He made his professional debut on 30 August 2021 against Reggiana.

On 1 September 2022, Gambale joined Avellino on loan with an option to buy and an obligation to buy in case of Avellino's promotion to Serie B.

References

External links
 
 

1998 births
Living people
Footballers from Rome
Italian footballers
Association football forwards
Serie C players
Serie D players
Eccellenza players
Lupa Roma F.C. players
Montevarchi Calcio Aquila 1902 players
U.S. Avellino 1912 players